Cody Campbell  may refer to:

Cody Campbell (American football), American football player for the Indianapolis Colts, 2005 Indianapolis Colts season
Cody Campbell (bull rider), professional bull rider, Built Ford Tough Series
Cody Campbell, ice hockey player in 2009–10 Alabama–Huntsville Chargers ice hockey season